The 2009 Honkbal Hoofdklasse season began Saturday, April 11.

Standings

League leaders

Postseason

Playoffs
The playoffs began on Thursday, August 6.

Neptunus vs. Kinheim

Amsterdam vs. Pioniers

Holland Series
The Holland Series will begin on Saturday, September 4.

Neptunus vs. Pioniers

References

External links
De Nederlandse honkbalsite
KNBSB – The Dutch Baseball and Softball Association

Honkbal Hoofdklasse
Honk